Bradford Sabres were an English ice hockey team that played in Division 2 North league of the British Universities Ice Hockey Association. They played their home games at the Bradford Ice Arena, Bradford, West Yorkshire. They were formed in 2005.

Introduction 

The Bradford Sabres were the ice hockey team for the University of Bradford and were run and funded by the University of Bradford Union. The club began in 2005 when a number of students decided that there should be an ice hockey club at the university. The early sessions consisted of only a handful of players, almost all of whom had no previous experience playing hockey. With the sessions being run by captain Mike Currie with the help of experienced netminder Kaz Matsumoto, the players started to gain some experience and it was decided that the club would enter into the British Universities Ice Hockey Association, Division 2 North cup competition.

The club folded in 2020, with many players moving to the Leeds Gryphons

Seasons

2005–2006 

Although the team was gaining more experience, numbers were still very low until the in-take of freshers at the beginning of the 2005-2006 season. Amongst these were not only a large number of beginners, but also several players with previous experience, most notably Jan Kucera and Tim Kelly. The team's very first game was away against the Sheffied Bears where although they were beaten 7-0, there were several outstanding performances. Netminder Kaz Matsumoto was awarded man of the match having faced over 70 shots and there was also a superb performance by defender Tim Kelly who was on the ice for 56 of the 60 minutes played.

The Sabres first home game showed a marked improvement from their loss at Sheffield. Even though they were defeated 6-9 by the Birmingham Eagles proving that the team could score goals was a major boost. Making his debut in this match was Czech Republic born Jan Kucera who introduced himself to university hockey by scoring all six of the Sabres goals and deservedly winning his first Man of the Match award.

The Sabres first win came in their next game against the Newcastle Wildcats. This was the first of many very close and enjoyable games between the two teams. The Sabres won, 6-5. Once again Jan Kucera scored all six for the Sabres, and after only two matches for the club, he was already being recognised as the best player in the division. Man of the Match in this game was rookie netminder Stephen Wilson, playing the second thirty minutes and helping the team to hold on for their first victory.

However, that was the only victory the team had in their debut season, and they finished bottom of the division of seven teams. Another moment of note that season was away at Newcastle. The team were down 3-0 at the end of the first period, and looked out of the game. In the second period Jan Kucera scored a hat-trick in under one minute, scoring the first from open play, and the next two by winning the face-off and scoring un-assisted. The team lost the match 4-3, but the game still is still much talked about because of the hat-trick. The team were due to compete in their first ever national championships in April, where teams from both the north and south divisions competed over a weekend in a cup competition. However, due to administration complications not only were the team not allowed to compete, but they were also disqualified from the league, and their final position of seventh did not count. Although the games that were played didn't officially count, the experience the team gained was valuable for next season and for the continued growth of the club.

The end of the Sabres first season saw the departure of some key players. Jan Kucera - who still holds the record for goals scored - took the step up to the English National Ice Hockey League to play for the Bradford Bulldogs. Forward Ben Moss along with defenders Toni Brook and Louisa Bellis also departed the team after completing their final year at the university.

Off the ice there were also changes. President Ben Nunney along with treasurer Ben Neal left the university and their positions were taken over by Hassan Majeed and James Davidson while web officer Mike Currie continued with his role and Stephen Wilson took over the newly created position of fixtures Secretary.

Players of note

Executive committee

On-ice officials

Awards

Season records

All-time records

Sabres Alumni Game

References 

Bradford Sabres website
University of Bradford Union

Ice hockey teams in England